Becker Island (Ostrov Bekkera) is an island in Franz Josef Land, Arkhangelsk Oblast, Russian Arctic.

Becker Island was named after Moritz Alois Becker (1812-1887), the general secretary of Austrian Geographical Society.

Geography
Becker Island is long and narrow, stretching from East to West. It is located straight south of Rainer Island.

The Kupol Surova (Купол Сурова) ice dome covers the western part of the island.
The eastern half of this island is unglacierized. The eastern headland, Cape Galkovsky (Mys Galkovskogo) is relatively close to the island's highest point. The western headland is Cape Lopast.

See also 
 List of islands of Russia
 List of glaciers in Russia

References

External links 
UNEP - Islands 
Geographic data

Islands of Franz Josef Land
Uninhabited islands of Russia